The Nanai language (also called Gold, Goldi, or Hezhen) is spoken by the Nanai people in Siberia, and to a much smaller extent in China's Heilongjiang province, where it is known as Hezhe.  The language has about 1,400 speakers out of 17,000 ethnic Nanai, but most (especially the younger generations) are also fluent in Russian or Chinese, and mostly use one of those languages for communication.

Nomenclature 
In China, the language is referred to as Hèzhéyǔ.

Distribution
The language is distributed across several distantly-located areas:
 Middle/lower Amur dialects (Naykhin, Dzhuen, Bolon, Ekon, etc.): the areas along the Amur River below Khabarovsk (Nanai, Amursk, Solnechny and Komsomolsk districts of Khabarovsk Krai);
 Kur-Urmi dialect: the area around the city of Khabarovsk (the Kur and Urmi rivers, and the Khabarovsk District of Khabarovsk Krai); probably not Nanai or even Southern Tungusic (see Kili language);
 Bikin dialect: Pozharsky District of Primorsky Krai (near the middle Ussuri River);
 Sungari dialect: boundary areas of the Ussuri River in China.

It is thought that in Russia, the Nanai language has been best preserved in the Nanai District of Khabarovsk Krai, because of the active Nanai-speaking community there, which has been active in working on the publication of books in Nanai, as well as textbooks on the language, and also because of the ethnic autonomous status of the Nanai District. According to Stolyarov's data, the worldwide Nanai population is 11,883, of whom 8,940 live in rural localities of Khabarovsk Krai. However, only 100–150 native speakers of the language remain there. The 2002 Census recorded 12,194 Nanai people who claimed to speak  Russian as well.  Three ethnic Nanai villages remain, those being Dzhuen, Ulika, and Dada; in the remaining populated areas, the proportion of Nanais among local residents is much smaller.

Scholars in China have traditionally presented less fine-grained dialect classifications; An identified only two, Hezhen and Qile'en, the former referring to all varieties of the language spoken in Russia. He conducted his studies in Jiejinkou, Bacha, And Sipai villages in Heilongjiang; at the time of his survey in 1982, the youngest fluent speaker was 55, and the oldest 72.

Historical dialect classifications 

There are several classifications of Nanai dialects. Early classifications tended to be areal and paid less attention to criteria for the differentiation of dialects. Lipskoy-Val'rond's classification, which distinguishes seven dialects, is one example of this; he distinguished the Sungari, Upper Amur, Ussuri, Urmi, Kur, Central Amur, and Lower Amur dialects. In the 1920s, the period of initial studies of the Nanai language, the area of settlement of the Nanai people was more extensive than at present; many dialects, which had not yet been classified by researchers, later disappeared, and remain unnamed.

The next period of studies did not begin until after a 20-year interruption, at the end of the 1940s; by then, the number of dialects had grown, and subsequent classifications distinguished as many as ten. Also, the distribution of the Nanai language had sharply narrowed; many Lower Amur and Ussuri dialects remained unstudied. According to Sunik's classification, which emphasizes morphological and phonetic features, "Nanaian language forms two groups, which are decomposed into a number of dialects".

 Upper Amur: Sakachi-Alyan, Naykhin, Bolon, Dzhuen, Garin
 Central Amur: Kur-Urmi, Bikin, Right-bank Amur, Sungari, Ussuri

Avrorin divided the language into three varieties: Sungari (aka Upper Amur), (Lower) Amur, and Kur-Urmi, further subdividing them into a number of dialects. The basic difference with Sunik's classification concerns the Amur and Upper Amur groups: Avrovin considered Bolon and Dzhuen under Naykhin, while separating Kur-Urmi as its own group, while Sunik viewed Kur-Urmi as a dialect. Sem, in contrast, classified Nanai into Upper, Central, and Lower Amur groups, each divided into a number of dialects; he counted a total of ten dialects.

 Upper Amur: Right-bank Amur, Sungari, Bikin (Ussuri), Kur-Urmi
 Central Amur: Sakachi-Alyan, Naykhin, Dzhuen
 Lower Amur: Bolon, Ekon, Gorin

Among the contemporary carriers of Nanaian language (middle and lower Amur dialects), dialect levelling and mixing has occurred due to extensive population migrations and the system of teaching of Nanai language (based on the Naykhin dialect); therefore it is difficult to differentiate the dialects in contemporary language data.

Pedagogy
The Nanai language is taught in secondary schools in Russia, mainly in Nanai villages in Khabarovsk Krai.

In China, the Nanai (Hezhe) people use Chinese for writing. The number of speakers has been in continual decline for decades; by the 1980s, the use of the language was restricted to special situations and communication with family members. In an effort to reverse this decline, a text book for Hezhe schoolchildren discussing the Hezhe language was published in 2005 (in pinyin transcription).

Orthography 
In the history of the Nanai written, there are 3 stages:

 until the early 1930s, early attempts to create Cyrillic script writing;
 1931–1937 – Latin script;
 since 1937 – modern Cyrillic script.

The first books in the Nanai language were printed by Russian Orthodox missionaries in the late 19th century in a Cyrillic orthography. In the 1920s–30s, after several false starts, the modern written form of the Nanai language was created by a team of Russian linguists led by Valentin Avrorin. The Nanai language uses the same alphabet as the Russian alphabet.

Nanai Latin script (1931–1937) 
In 1930, it was decided to create a Unified Northern Alphabet on the Latin basis for the small-numbered peoples of the North. In January 1932, these alphabets, including Nanai, were officially approved at the I All-Russian Conference on the Development of Languages and Writings of the Peoples of the North. The approved Nanai alphabet was as follows:

In some versions of the alphabet, the letter Ꞓ ꞓ was replaced with the usual Latin C c and meant the same sound.

Nanai Cyrillic script (1937 – present) 
On June 5, 1936, the Presidium of the Council of Nationalities of the CEC of the USSR decided to translate the written language of the peoples of the North, including the Nanai, into Cyrillic. At the beginning of 1937, the Nanai Cyrillic alphabet was officially approved - it included all the letters of the Russian alphabet except Щ щ and Ъ ъ. The sound [ŋ] was indicated by a combination of letters Нг нг. In 1939, the Nanai spelling rules in Cyrillic were adopted, refined in 1958, when the Nanai alphabet began to contain all 33 letters of the Russian alphabet, as well as the letter Ӈ ӈ (instead of Нг нг). However, in fact, in most publications, instead of Ӈ ӈ, the use of Нг нг continued.

The current version of the Nanai alphabet was approved in 1993. The modern Nanai alphabet has the following form:

To indicate long vowels in the educational literature, diacritics are used – macrons above the letters.

In China, where Nanai residents also live, in 1987 a reading book for Nanai schools was published with parallel text in Chinese and Nanai languages. Pinyin was used to write the Nanai text.

Alphabet matching table 

Sample text from a Bible translation published in 2002 is shown below.

Phonology

Vowels and vowel harmony 
The Nanai language has seven phonemic vowels: . There are twelve allowed diphthongs: ; there are also two allowed triphthongs: . Phonemic vowels change as follows based on surrounding consonants:
  is elided after 
  becomes  after 
  becomes  after 
 A glottal stop  is inserted before  when it begins a syllable and precedes .
  may optionally become  in non-initial syllables
 A vowel in a final syllable is nasalised when it precedes 

The following table summarises the rules of vowel harmony.

Consonants 
As for consonants, there are twenty-eight:

Phonemic consonants may optionally change as follows:
  become  (respectively) between two vowels

Dialects 
Phonology of the various dialects of Nanai has been influenced by surrounding languages. Tolskaya specifically noted several phonological peculiarities of Bikin dialect which may indicate influence from Udege, including monophthongisation of diphthongs, denasalisation of nasal vowels, deletion of reduced final vowels, epenthetic vowel preventing consonant final words, and the deletion of intervocalic .

Lexicon 

Tolskaya's survey of the Nanai language also noted a variety of loanwords from Chinese, such as  "calendar" from Chinese 日曆 (Pinyin: rìlì); a few also came from other languages, such as [pomidor] (tomato), almost certainly from Russian помидор, though the exact route of transmission is not attested and it may have been reborrowed from other neighbouring languages rather than directly from Russian. There is also some vocabulary shared with Mongolian and the Turkic languages, such as:
  ("beard"; Mongolian , Uyghur and Kazakh );
  ("chicken"; Mongolian , Uyghur , Kazakh );
  ("sheep"; Mongolian , Uyghur and Kazakh ).
These too are likely loanwords, though proponents of the Altaic hypothesis may take these as evidence of a genetic relationship. Conversely, the Nanai language itself has also contributed some loanwords to the Udege language, supplanting Udege vocabulary:
  (thank you), from Nanai , instead of Udege ;
  (work), from Nanai , instead of Udege ;
  (book) from Nanai , itself a loanword from Chinese 單子 (Pinyin: dānzi), which actually means "list".
A large degree of mutual assimilation of the two languages has been observed in the Bikin region; the Udege language itself only has 230 speakers left.

Notes

Sources

Further reading

General works 
 
 
 
 
 
 
 
 
 
 
Nanai alphabet on Omniglot

Texts in Nanai

Dictionaries

External links

Nanai writing on Omniglot
Distribution map at The Linguist List
ELAR archive of Endangered Tungusic languages of Khabarovskij Kraj (including Kur-Urmi)

Agglutinative languages
Languages of Russia
Khabarovsk Krai
Languages of China
Tungusic languages
Endangered languages